Anna Nagar Tower Park, officially known as Dr Visvesvaraya Tower Park, is an urban park in the suburb of Anna Nagar, Chennai. It is the tallest park tower in Chennai. The tower has been closed for the public. However, the park is still open.

History
Anna Nagar Tower Park was built in 1968 as part of the World Trade Fair. The park was built by B. S. Abdur Rahman and was inaugurated by former Vice-President V. V. Giri in the presence of the then Chief Minister of Tamil Nadu C. N. Annadurai on 21 January 1968.

The park was renovated at a cost of  62 million and reopened in 2010.

Location
Anna Nagar Tower Park is located near the chief roundabout of the neighbourhood (known as the Anna Nagar Roundana) and the Anna Nagar Ayyappan Temple. The park has two entrances. The main entrance is located on the 3rd Main Road next to the Tower Club. The second entrance lies near the Ayyappan Temple on the 6th Main Road.

The park
The park covers an area of 15.35 acres and is one of the few remaining lung spaces in the city. The main component of the park is the 135-foot-tall, 12-storied tower located at the centre of the park. The tower has cyclic ramp spiraling to the top. The tower also has an elevator at the centre. The park, along with the tower, is maintained by the Chennai Corporation. The park has an amphitheatre, a bird-watching deck, badminton courts, play area for kids, a skating rink, a lake, and convenience facilities for the visitors.
 
After the December 2015 rains, the Lake area is full of large fishes, Birds and Turtles and has become a major attraction for the locals.

Since the local police are not able to effectively manage the tower, entry to the tower has been banned since 2011 due in part to instances of suicides and scribblers, thereby depriving the city of a valuable tourist location. In 2018, the authorities started renovating the tower at a cost of  3 million with a plan to reopen the tower to the public.

Gallery

Nearby attractions
 Aavin Ice Cream Parlor 
 Tower Club
 Connections
 Anna Nagar Plaza
 Little Italy
 AnnaNagar Ayyappan Koil

See also

 Anna Arches
 Parks in Chennai

References

Tourist attractions in Chennai
Parks in Chennai
Urban public parks
Memorials to C. N. Annadurai
1968 establishments in Madras State